Un Hombre Discreto (English: A discreet man) is the fourth studio album by Mexican pop singer Mijares. This album was released in 1989 earning 7 Gold and 3 Platinum discs.

History
This album marked a very meaningful change in his career. Mijares left his previous producers and began to work with producer Oscar López and Argentinean composer Daniel Freiberg. The album spanned two of his most successful hits: "Baño de mujeres" and the ballad "Para amarnos más".

Track listing
Tracks :
 No es normal (It is not usual) - 4:20
 Un hombre discreto (A discreet man) - 4:38
 Para amarnos más (To love each other more) - 3:28
 Me acordaré de ti (I will remember you) - 3:34
 Piel de luna (Moonskin) - 4:18
 Baño de mujeres (Ladies' restroom) - 3:11
 Leña seca (Dry wood) - 4:03
 Fuera de combate (Knocked out) - 3:58
 No busques más (Look no further) - 4:15
 Alfonsina y el mar (Alfonsina and the sea) - 4:58

Singles
 Para amarnos más
 Baño de mujeres
 Me acordaré de ti

Single charts

Album charts
The album reached the 4th position in Billboard Latin Pop Albums.

1989 albums
Manuel Mijares albums